California's 37th congressional district is a congressional district in the U.S. state of California based in Los Angeles County.  It includes many neighborhoods west and southwest of Downtown Los Angeles.

The district includes 
Culver City
Inglewood
the City of Los Angeles neighborhoods of Mid City, Century City, Beverlywood, View Park-Windsor Hills, Pico-Robertson, Exposition Park, University Park, Vermont Knolls, West Adams, Leimert Park, Jefferson Park, Vermont Square, Ladera Heights, Hyde Park, Crenshaw, and Baldwin Hills.

The district is highly diverse ethnically. Approximately 40% of the district's residents are Hispanic, while African Americans and whites make up nearly a quarter each.

The district is currently represented by Democrat Sydney Kamlager-Dove; she was elected to the seat in the 2022 midterm elections and took office on January 3, 2023.

Competitiveness

In statewide races

Composition

As of the 2020 redistricting, California's 37th congressional district is located in the South Los Angeles region.

Los Angeles County is split between this district, the 30th district, the 34th district, the 36th district, the 42nd district, and the 43rd district. The 37th, 30th and 36th are partitioned by Phyllis Ave, N Doheny Dr, N Oakhurst Dr, Burton Way, N Robertson Blvd, 8733 Clifton Way-201 S Le Doux Rd, N San Vicente Blvd, La Cienga Park, S Le Doux Rd, Gregory Way, S Robertson Blvd, Whitworth Dr, Beverly Green Dr, 1271 Beverly Green Dr-1333 Beverly Green Dr, Heath Ave, S Moreno Dr, Highway 2, Century Park W, W Pico Blvd, Patricia Ave, Lorenzo Pl, Monte Mar Dr, Beverwill Dr, Castle Heights Ave, Club Dr, McConnell Dr, National Blvd, Palms Blvd, Overland Ave, Venice Blvd, Highway 405, W Havelock Ave, S St Nicholas Ave, Ballona Creek, and Centinela Creek Channel.

The 37th, 34th and 42nd are partitioned by Crenshaw Blvd, W Pico Blvd, S Normandie Ave, Highway 10, Harbor Freeway, E 7th St, S Alameda St, S Alameda St, E Slauson Ave, S Central Ave, Firestone Blvd-E 90 St.

The 37th and 43rd are partitioned by E 91st St, McKinley Ave, E 88th Pl, Avalon Blvd, E Manchester Ave, S Normandie Ave, W 94th Pl, S Halldale Ave, W Century Blvd, La Salle Ave/S Denker Ave, W 104th St, S Western Ave, W 108th St, S Gramercy Pl, S Van Ness Ave, W 76th St, 8th Ave, W 79th St, S Victoria Ave, W 74th St, West Blvd, W 64th St, S La Brea Ave, 6231 S La Brea Ave-Flight Ave, W 64th St, 6404 S Springpark Ave-W Fairview Blvd, and W Centinela Ave. 

The 37th district take in the city of Culver City, and the Los Angeles neighborhoods of Jefferson Park, Hyde Park, Ladera, and the north side of Century City.

Cities & CDP with 10,000 or more people
 Los Angeles - 3,898,747
 Inglewood - 107,762
 Culver City - 40,779

List of members representing the district

Election results

1962

1964

1966

1968

1970

1972

1974

1975 (Special)

1976

1978

1980

1982

1984

1986

1988

1990

1992

1994

1996 (Special)

1996

1998

2000

2002

2004

2006

2007 (Special)

2008

2010

2012

2014

2016

2018

2020

2022

Historical district boundaries
From 2003 through 2013, the district consisted of central Los Angeles County, from Compton  to Long Beach. Due to redistricting after the 2010 United States Census, the district has moved northwest within Los Angeles County and includes Culver City and Inglewood.

See also
List of United States congressional districts

References

External links
Current (post 2012) district map—GovTrack.us: California's 37th congressional district
Historic district descriptions -- RAND California Election Returns: District Definitions
Historic (2012 and earlier) district map -- California Voter Foundation map - CD37

37
Government of Los Angeles County, California
Baldwin Hills, Los Angeles
Baldwin Hills (mountain range)
Century City, Los Angeles
Crenshaw, Los Angeles
Culver City, California
Exposition Park (Los Angeles neighborhood)
Harvard Heights, Los Angeles
Inglewood, California
Jefferson Park, Los Angeles
Mar Vista, Los Angeles
Rancho Park, Los Angeles
South Los Angeles
University Park, Los Angeles
West Adams, Los Angeles
West Los Angeles
Westside (Los Angeles County)
Constituencies established in 1963
1963 establishments in California